Moriseni Peak is the mostly ice-covered peak rising to 1740 m in Lassus Mountains, northern Alexander Island in Antarctica.  It has steep and partly ice-free south slopes, and surmounts Nichols Snowfield to the east and Narechen Glacier to the northwest. 
British mapping in 1971.
The feature is named after the ancient Thracian tribe of Moriseni inhabiting the Bulgarian Black Sea Coast.

Location

Maps
 British Antarctic Territory. Scale 1:200000 topographic map. DOS 610 – W 69 70. Tolworth, UK, 1971
 Antarctic Digital Database (ADD). Scale 1:250000 topographic map of Antarctica. Scientific Committee on Antarctic Research (SCAR). Since 1993, regularly upgraded and updated

Notes

References
 Bulgarian Antarctic Gazetteer. Antarctic Place-names Commission. (details in Bulgarian, basic data in English)
 Moriseni Peak. SCAR Composite Gazetteer of Antarctica

External links
 Moriseni Peak. Copernix satellite image

Mountains of Alexander Island
Bulgaria and the Antarctic